ATV Asia was a high-definition TV channel operated by the Hong Kong Asia Television, starting on April 1, 2009 at 6:00am, broadcast 24 hours a day from the night of television channels.

Asia Television
Television channels and stations established in 2009
Chinese-language television stations
Television channels and stations disestablished in 2016